Vim Records was a short-lived American record label that was active during the early 1900s.  Vim discs include issues of ragtime banjo music recorded by Vess L. Ossman.

History
The Vim Company was founded in 1896 in Chicago, Illinois, and it was active in labeling records in the first decade of the 20th century. Vim was primarily a sporting goods store but also sold bicycles and electrical goods. Record Research newsletter categorizes the firm as a "Department Store Label", meaning the owners entered an agreement with an already established record company, and "... they proceeded to have their own records pressed with the name of the department store prominently printed on the label."

Vim Records were single-sided lateral cut disc records. Vim was recorded and manufactured by the International Talking Machine Company and Leeds & Catlin.

The company offices were moved between 1901 and 1903. Known address are:
 56-60 Fifth Avenue, Chicago, Illinois
 68 E. Lake Street, Chicago, Illinois (1903); after street renumbering this was 10 Lake Street
 39 S. Clark Street, Chicago, Illinois; Company Headquarters

A branch office was opened in late 1903 at 704 West Walnut Street, Des Moines, Iowa. In 1906 the branch was moved to 808 West Walnut Street, and in 1907 it was moved to 204 7th Street. This location remained open until late 1908 when the firm of Harger & Blish, an established firm from Dubuque, Iowa, were appointed the jobbers in Des Moines.

The last listing for the firm producing records in Chicago was in the Edison Phonograph Monthly January 1910 issue.

The owner and president of the company was Leon Atwell Olmsted, a native of New York who moved to Chicago in the 1890s. After opening his first store in 1896, he eventually expanded to seven stores in Chicago and another seventeen throughout the nation. It was reported that he died in a fire at his home in Minocqua, Wisconsin, at the age of 63, but it was soon learned that he died of exhaustion after fighting the blaze. At the time of his death in 1936 the stores were being managed by his son Leslie B. Olmsted.

Record numbers
The record numbers on Vim labels can be broken down into multiple series.  The following companies are known to have produced records for Vim.

 Leeds & Catlin: V-prefixed records are from Sun and associated labels
 International Record Company (IRC): X-prefixed records are from Excelsior and associated labels

All unprefixed record numbers in the chart below appear to have been produced by IRC.  Every artist and recording name matches up with the IRC catalog numbers.

Record labels
The word "Vim" in stylized cursive text appears on all of the record labels along with a double lined border, the company name, "Chicago, Ill.", and the words, "For Any Disc Talking Machine". The background color for all labels is beige, but in some photos the coloring appears to be white, light yellow, or mint green. Aging and years of handling have caused some labels to become dark beige in appearance.

Some labels have the recording details (record number, artist, etc.) printed in black ink while others are in red ink. It is unknown if there is any significance to the printing color of the recording details.

Recordings
All recordings in this chart must be verified by seeing the information on a Vim Record label or in a Vim Company catalog.  A Leeds & Catlin or International Record Company catalog that do not specifically state "Vim Record" are not sources for adding new records to this chart.

Unconfirmed information in any row must have an asterisk symbol (*) placed beside the information.  This may happen because the label is not readable or the information was not printed on the label.  The International Record Company recording catalog is useful for obtaining Vim Records information, but unless actually seen on a Vim label, all such information should be marked with an asterisk symbol.

All information in the chart must be placed in order by the "Record Number."

{| class="wikitable sortable"
|-
! Record Number
! Artist(s)
! Recording Name
! Type
! Year Recorded & Notes
|-
|
| Frederichs and Strange
| Jesus Lover of My Soul
| Duet
| This is likely baritone William Frederichs and soprano Ellen Strang, but the title is not in the IRC catalog.  Spellings of their names differ.
|-
| 316
| Metropolitan Band 
| Coax Me
| Medley Two Step
|
|-
| 343
| Metropolitan Band
| Washington Post March
| March
|
|-
| 604
| Peluso's Orchestra 
| Grand March from "Faust" (Soldier's Chorus) 
|
|
|-
| 1560
| Frank Stanley
| In Dear Old Georgia
| Baritone Solo
|
|-
| 1575*
| Frank Stanley
| The Old Church Bell
| Baritone Solo*
|
|-
| 1604
| Frank Stanley
| When the Mocking Birds Are Singing in the Wildwood
| Baritone Solo
|
|-
| 1621
| Joe Brown
| So Long Mary
| Baritone Solo
|
|-
| 1640
| Arthur Collins Orchestra Accompaniment
| You Look Awfully Good To Father
| Baritone Solo
| 
|-
| 2050
| Billy Murray*
| Give My Regards to Broadway
| Tenor Solo
|
|-
| 2054
| Billy Murray
| I've Got a Little Money, and I Saved it All For You
| Tenor Solo
|
|-
| 2098
| Billy Murray
| You're A Grand Old Rag
| Tenor Solo
|
|-
| 2099
| Billy Murray
| Cheyenne (Shy Ann)*
| Tenor Solo
|
|-
| 2105
| Billy Murray
| How Would You Like to Spoon With Me?
| Tenor Solo
|
|-
| 2707
| Spencer & Jones
| Every Little Bit Helps
| Vaudeville Sketch
|
|-
| 3003
| Vess L. Ossman
| The Gay Gossoon
| Banjo Solo
|
|-
| 3006
| Metropolitan Band
| Free Lance March (Sousa)
| 
|
|-
| 3009
| Metropolitan Band of New York*
| The Flag of Victory March
| Band*
|
|-
| 3040
| G. P. Watson
| Hi Le, Hi Lo (German Hunter Song)
| Yodel Song
|
|-
| 3059
| Metropolitan Band of New York*
| Stradella Overture
| Band*
|
|-
| 3063
| Metropolitan Band of New York*
| Hero of the Sea 
| March
|
|-
| 3098 (Possibly 3070?)
| Vess L. Ossman
| So Long Mary, Intro. "Mary's a Grand Old Name"
| Banjo Solo
|
|-
| 3105
| Collins & Harlan
| It's up to You to Move
| Baritone and Tenor Duet
| 
|-
| 3113
| Metropolitan Band of New York*
| Royal Italian March (Gambetti) 
| Band
|
|-
| V-2
| Harold Eisenberg
| Traumerei (Reverie)
| Violin Solo
|
|-
| V-11
| Henry Burr
| Silver Heels
| Tenor Solo
|
|-
| X304
| Metropolitan Band of New York*
| Merry Makers
| Band
|
|-
| X317
| Metropolitan Band of New York*
| First Kiss Waltz
| Band*
|
|-
| X323
| Metropolitan Band of New York*
| At The Race Track
| Band
|
|-
| X336
| Metropolitan Band of New York*
| The Forge in the Forest
| Band
|
|-
| X617*
| Orchestra 
| The Jolly Coppersmith
| With Vocal Solo and Chorus
|Only a partial record number was visible so this could by just "617".
|-
| X620
| Peluso's Orchestra*
| Love's Dreamland Waltz
| Orchestra
|
|-
| X635
| Peluso's Orchestra, with calls*
| Metropolitan Lanciers
| Band
|
|-
| X638
| Peluso's Orchestra, with calls*
| Recreation quadrille
| Band
|
|-
| X642
| Peluso's Orchestra*
| Miesrere from "Ill Trovatore
| Orchestra
|
|-
| X 1523*
| Arthur Collins*
| The Preacher and the Bear"
| Baritone and Orchestra Accompaniment
|
|-
| X 1532
| Frank C. Stanley*
| Where the Sunset Turns to Ocean's Blue to Gold| Baritone Solo with orchestra accompaniment
|
|-
| X 1572
| Frank C. Stanley
| Old Man Moon| Baritone Solo with Orch. Accom.
|
|-
| X2087
| Byron G. Harlan*
| Somebody's Sweethart I want to be| Tenor Solo (w. orchestra accompaniment)
|
|-
| X2163
| Henry Burr & George Gordon
| My Old Kentucky Home| Tenor & Baritone Duet
|
|}

Other labels
There are at least two other record labels that use/used the acronym "VIM."
 Variety In Music (VIM), in New York City, approximately 1959–1964 
 Very Important Music (V.I.M.), in Thessaloniki, Greece, established in 2007

 See also 
 List of record labels

References

 The American Record Label Book'' by Brian Rust, 1984, HarperCollins
 mainspringpress.com
 dinosaurdiscs.com

Defunct companies based in Chicago
Defunct record labels of the United States